Skinheads is a 1989 American thriller film, directed, written and produced by Greydon Clark. It is Clark's third film to deal with racial themes, after The Bad Bunch (1973) and Black Shampoo (1976).

Plot
A group of neo-Nazi skinheads violently rob a Jewish grocery. After they flee the scene of the crime, they stop at a roadside diner where they encounter some traveling students. The neo-Nazis terrorize the students and the owner of the diner, leaving two survivors who escape to the nearby Colorado mountains. The neo-Nazis give chase but are met with opposition when a World War II veteran living in the woods comes to the aid of the students.

Cast
Barbara Bain as Martha
Jason Culp as Jeff
Elizabeth Sagal as Amy
Chuck Connors as Mr. Huston
Frank Noon as Walt

References

External links
 
 

1989 films
Films directed by Greydon Clark
1989 thriller films
Skinhead films
1980s gang films
American thriller films
1980s English-language films
1980s American films